Badrabad-e Chahgavari (also Romanized as Badrābād-e Chahgavārī; also known as Badrābād, Badrābād-e Chegūrī, and Bāqerābād) is a village in Gonbaki Rural District, Gonbaki District, Rigan County, Kerman Province, Iran. At the 2006 census, its population was 154, in 33 families.

References 

Populated places in Rigan County